Stuart Townend may refer to:

 Stuart Townend (headmaster) (1909–2002), British athlete, soldier and school headmaster
 Stuart Townend (musician) (born 1963), English hymnwriter and worship leader